Callicoon Center is a hamlet in Sullivan County, New York, United States. Callicoon Center has a post office with ZIP code 12724, which opened on August 16, 1849.

References

Hamlets in Sullivan County, New York
Hamlets in New York (state)